The 2013 PBA D-League Foundation Cup is the second conference of the 2012-13 PBA Developmental League season. There are three new teams participating the league: Jumbo Plastic Linoleum Giants, Hog's Breath Cafe Razorbacks and EA Regen Med.

Format
The following format will be observed for the duration of the tournament:
 Single-round robin eliminations; 10 games per team; Teams are then seeded by basis on win–loss records. In case of tie, playoffs will be held only for the #2 and #6 seeds.
 The top two teams after the elimination round will automatically advance to the semifinals.
 Quarterfinals:
 QF1: #3 team vs. #6 team (#3 seed twice-to-beat)
 QF2: #4 team vs. #5 team (#4 seed twice-to-beat)
 The winners of the quarterfinals will challenge the top two teams in a best-of-three semifinals series. Matchups are:
 SF1: #1 vs. QF2
 SF2: #2 vs. QF1
The winners in the semifinals advance to the best of three Finals.

Elimination round

Team standings

Schedule

Results

Bracket

Quarterfinals

Boracay Rum vs. EA

Fruitas vs. Big Chill

Semifinals

NLEX-Big Chill series

Blackwater-Boracay Rum series

Finals

See also
List of developmental and minor sports leagues
PBA Developmental League
Philippine Basketball Association

References

External links
Official website

PBA D-League Foundation Cup
2012–13 in Philippine basketball